Inga Möller (born 27 April 1973) is a German former field hockey player who competed in the 2000 Summer Olympics.

References

External links
 

1973 births
Living people
German female field hockey players
Olympic field hockey players of Germany
Field hockey players at the 2000 Summer Olympics